David Stuurman (c. 1773 – 22 February 1830) was a Khoi chief and political activist who fought against Dutch and British colonial administration. His active career as Khoi leader spanned twenty years (1799-1819) and the three Xhosa Wars which fell within this period.

Early life
David Stuurman was a leader of the Khoi people, who fought against Dutch and British colonial rule in the Eastern Cape. Stuurman became involved in political activism during the 18th century when both the Khoi and San people were systematically dispossessed of their lands under “on ordinance by the colonists”. This meant that Stuurman, and other indigenous people, were forced to live and work on their land as labourers.

As a teenager, Stuurman went out to work on the farm of the Vermaak family, who owned a farm at Gamtoos. Among numerous incidents reported by the Bethelsdorp missionaries concerning the mistreatment of the Khoi and San at the hands of the colonialists, is a report on the poor treatment and physical abuse Johannes “Hannes” Vermaak meted out to Stuurman. The missionaries report details how Stuurman was tied to a wagon and beaten with a sjambok; after the beating salt was rubbed into his wounds and he was left tied to the wagon in the blistering sun.

During the 1790s, when the second of the Xhosa Wars broke out, Stuurman, his brother Klaas, the chief and their family abandoned Vermaak's farm along with several other Khoi in the region.

Political career
The Khoi joined forces with the Xhosa tribes and refused to return to the farm lands, thus they were labelled “the rebel captains”. They refused to return to the farms they were indentured on and many went to live at the Bethelsdorp Mission Station, near Algoa Bay.

In August, 1802, in an effort to regain Khoi independence, Stuurman led 700 men and 300 horsemen with 150 firearms, against Uniondale field cornet. In an effort to establish peace after the skirmish, Governor Francis Dundas granted land to Stuurman and his men.

In 1806, Klaas Stuurman died during a buffalo hunting expedition and David succeeded him as the chief. David was suspected, even by some Khoi, to be behind his brother’s death. After Klaas’s death, the Uitenhage Magistrate, Jacob Cuyler, rescinded the land grant and unrest flared up again.

After his brother’s death Stuurman offered refuge to escaped slaves and other fugitives. They refused to appear before General Jacob Cuyler about the matter of the fugitives and as a result, the authorities bore down on their settlement.

Many of the Khoi were bound into service, their livestock and land confiscated and David and three others were imprisoned in Cape Town in early 1809. On 11 September, David Stuurman was officially charged and sent to Robben Island—he was among the first political prisoners to be jailed on the island. His crime was cited as “Disobedience to the Field Cornet”.

By December, Stuurman and others had escaped Robben Island using whaling boats to reach the mainland. Most of them were recaptured, but Stuurman made his way back to the Eastern Cape.

He remained uncaptured until the fifth Xhosa War when he was captured again and put to hard labour on Robben Island. On the 9th of August 1820, Stuurman escaped from Robben Island again. This time during a prison mutiny orchestrated by Johan Smit, Hans Trompetter and Abraham Leendert.

Stuurman was captured when he reached the mainland and tried for his crimes, especially as a two-time escapee from Robben Island. He was sentenced to life imprisonment on the penal settlement at New South Wales. On 16 December 1820 he was sent, for the third time, to Robben Island and chained to a wall until the transportation order could be carried out.

Exile
In April 1823, the convict ship Brampton, reached Sydney with Stuurman and 11 other South Africans, including another Khoikhoi, Jantjie Piet on board. After six years in government service, working at military barracks, Stuurman obtained a ticket of leave which allowed him to work for wages. His wife drew up a petition to Queen Victoria for his release, but nothing came of it.

On 22 February 1830, David Stuurman died and was buried in the Roman Catholic section of Devonshire Street Cemetery. This cemetery was later resumed for Central railway station. It is likely that his remains were relocated to Bunnerong Cemetery, which is now part of Botany Cemetery, though this is unclear.

Legacy
In 2015, a statue was erected at the National Heritage Monument in Pretoria in honour of Stuurman’s memory. During the same year, protesters called for the removal of 112-year old statue of Queen Victoria which stands outside the Port Elizabeth library and replace it with a statue of David Stuurman.

Plans by the National Heritage Council to repatriate the human remains of David Stuurman from Sydney were anticipated to be realised in April 2014, as a part of the events to commemorate and celebrate 20 years of democracy in South Africa.

His remains could not be repatriated because a train station now stands where he lies and the nature of the project was complex, involving multiple stakeholders, extensive research and diplomatic interactions between South Africa and Australia.

On 13 June 2017, a traditional ceremony was conducted in Sydney to repatriate the spirit of David Stuurman. The spiritual repatriation involved the use of umphafa tree branches to carry Stuurman’s spirit. A second spiritual repatriation was conducted at the Sarah Baartman Heritage Centre in Hankey to put Stuurman to rest.

On 23 February 2021, Port Elizabeth Airport was renamed to Chief Dawid Stuurman International Airport in his honour.

See also
Khoikhoi-Dutch Wars
Xhosa Wars

References

External links
Victoria Must Go
Khoi Resistance to Colonialism

1770s births
1830 deaths
Khoikhoi
Military history of South Africa
People from the Eastern Cape
South African activists